Sebastiano Buzzin (December 24, 1929 in Cormons – December 17, 2007 in Locarno, Switzerland) was an Italian professional football player and coach.

Managerial career 
In 1964, he served as a player-coach for Montreal Cantalia in the National Soccer League. The following season he was the head coach for Montreal Italica in the Eastern Canada Professional Soccer League.

On June 15, 1971 he was named the head coach for the Montreal Olympique in the North American Soccer League.

Honours
 Serie A champion: 1952/53, 1953/54.

References  

1929 births
2007 deaths
People from Cormons
Italian footballers
Serie A players
F.C. Pavia players
Inter Milan players
ACF Fiorentina players
Hellas Verona F.C. players
Catania S.S.D. players
Italian expatriate footballers
Expatriate footballers in Switzerland
Italian expatriate sportspeople in Switzerland
AC Bellinzona players
FC Locarno players
Italian football managers
Association football forwards
A.S. Pro Gorizia players
Vigevano Calcio players
North American Soccer League (1968–1984) coaches
Canadian National Soccer League players
Canadian National Soccer League coaches
Italian expatriate sportspeople in Canada
Expatriate soccer players in Canada
Footballers from Friuli Venezia Giulia